Minna Maarit Aalto (born 8 November 1965) is a Finnish windsurfer. She competed in multiple sailing events at the 1996 and 2000 Summer Olympics.

References

1965 births
Living people
Sailors at the 1996 Summer Olympics – Mistral One Design
Sailors at the 2000 Summer Olympics – Mistral One Design
Finnish female sailors (sport)
Finnish windsurfers
Olympic sailors of Finland
Sportspeople from Turku
Female windsurfers